Kamangar Kola (also Romanized as Kamāngar Kolā) is a village in Balatajan Rural District, in the Central District of Qaem Shahr County, Mazandaran Province, Iran. At the 2006 census, its population was 212, comprising 52 families.

References 

Populated places in Qaem Shahr County